The Seven Lakes of San Pablo are seven volcanic crater lakes scattered around the City of San Pablo, in the province of Laguna, Philippines.

The Lakes

The seven lakes of the city are:
Lake Bunot
Lake Calibato, sometimes spelled as Lake Kalibato
The twin lakes of Yambo and Pandin
Lake Palakpakin, sometimes spelled as Lake Palacpaquin or Palacpaquen
Lake Muhikap, also known as Lake Mojicap or Lake Mohicap
Lake Sampaloc, also spelled as Lake Sampalok, the largest of the seven lakes

Geology
The lakes are maars or low-profile volcanic craters located in the San Pablo Volcanic Field.  They are among the 200 small monogenetic volcanoes found along the Macolod Corridor, a rift zone between Mount Makiling and Mount Banahaw, which is part of the larger Southwestern Luzon Volcanic Field. These craters are formed by phreatomagmatic eruptions, an eruption where ground water comes in contact with hot magma pushing up near the Earth's surface.

Petrographic Analysis
In a recent rocks and sediment analysis or petrographic study on the lakes and adjoining rivers in San Pablo, sulfate concentrations were considerably higher than the naturally occurring sulfates from volcanism.  Samples were taken from other areas underlain with similar volcanic rocks from the old eruptions (e.g. Taal volcano) like Indang, in the province of Cavite and the La Mesa Watershed, the water supply reservoir for Metropolitan Manila.  The analyses indicated that the elevated level of sulfates were not related to volcanism but anthropogenic or man-made, and among the causes are sewage, fertilizers, herbicides, pesticides etc.

Hiking trails
In 2005, the Rotary Club of San Pablo City held a ceremony that officially opened the hiking trails that connect the seven lakes of the city.  The Rotarians were aiming for economic, environmental and health benefits of the trails to the community.

Conservation
The lakes are threatened by human intervention and exploitation, most especially Lake Sampaloc, which is located right in the center of San Pablo City.  Several illegal settlements, illegal fish pens, commercial and business infrastructures on the shores have proliferated on some of the lakes causing increased pollution. Overuse of commercial fish feeds have resulted in high nitrogen levels and low dissolved oxygen that has led to fish kills in the early and late 1990s.  In January 2004, fish kills were observed in six of the seven lakes.  Various ecological conservation efforts by both government and non-government organizations, like the  Friends of the Seven Lakes Foundation, had been implemented in recent years. One of these is the demolition of human-made structures along the lakes' shoreline.

References

External links

 Friends of the Seven Lakes Foundation
 Tourism in San Pablo City

 
Monogenetic volcanoes
Maars of the Philippines
Tourist attractions in Laguna (province)